Daniel Zane Coakley (born December 13, 1989) is a Filipino-American swimmer who won two gold medals and a silver medal at the 2007 Southeast Asian Games. He competed in the 50 m freestyle at the 2008 Olympics, but failed to reach the final. Coakley is a great-grandson of Olympic medalist in swimming Teófilo Yldefonso.

References

External links 
 Biography at Pinoy Swimming
 West Hawaii Today Gold for Coakley
 RP down to 5th in SEA Games rank
 Philippines' Daniel could be a big star in the making
 Thai Natthanan wins fourth gold as records fall at SEA Games

1989 births
American male freestyle swimmers
Filipino male freestyle swimmers
American sportspeople of Filipino descent
Filipino people of American descent
Living people
Sportspeople from Hawaii
Olympic swimmers of the Philippines
Swimmers at the 2008 Summer Olympics
Swimmers at the 2006 Asian Games
Swimmers at the 2010 Asian Games
Swimmers from Hawaii
Southeast Asian Games medalists in swimming
Southeast Asian Games gold medalists for the Philippines
Southeast Asian Games competitors for the Philippines
Southeast Asian Games silver medalists for the Philippines
Competitors at the 2007 Southeast Asian Games
Asian Games competitors for the Philippines